Jaya TV HD is a Tamil language satellite television channel based in Chennai, India. Jaya TV HD is also broadcast to the expatriate Tamil community via various media partnerships. Hemant Sahai of HSA had Jaya TV HD as his first client. Jaya TV 
HD revamped from Oct 14th, 2018 with fresh look and content.

Shows

Media partners
Jaya TV broadcasts its shows in United States through DISH Network Channel 792 and in Singapore through mio TV (Jaya TV) on Channel 632 has been cease transmission since 1 July 2013 at 0000 hrs. In Malaysia it broadcasts through Astro (Jaya TV) on Channel 221 has been ceased transmission On June 1, 2020 at 0002 hrs and Unifi TV (Jaya MAX) on Channel 313 & (Jaya Movies) on Channel 314 (Coming Soon). It is also available in most of Indian DTH Services.

Jaya Plus (News) is also on DISH Network Channel 594 and JAYA Max (Music) on DISH Network Channel 595.

Jaya Max on Channel 313 and Jaya Movies on Channel 314 (Coming Soon) is available in Malaysia on Unifi TV. Jaya TV is available on Tharisanam TV for Australia and New Zealand viewers.

Now Available on Channels Jaya TV, Jaya Movies, Jaya MAX, and Jaya Plus on IPTV (Yupp TV).

See also
 ATN Jaya TV

References 

Jaya TV on Facebook
Jaya TV on Twitter

Tamil-language television channels
Television stations in Chennai
Television channels and stations established in 1999
1999 establishments in Tamil Nadu